Sebastian Kienle (born 6 July 1984) is a German long-distance triathlete. He is the winner of the 2014 Ironman World Championship, as well as the 2012 and 2013 Ironman 70.3 World Championship.

Athletic career
Kienle was exposed to the sport of triathlon for the first time at the age of 8 and then knew that he wanted to grow up to be a professional triathlete. He began competing in triathlons at the age of 12. Kienle competed in his first XTERRA Triathlon in 2005 in Germany, in which he won and had "an absolutely great race." That race prompted him to return the next year where he defended his title.

In 2009, he won Ironman 70.3 Germany in Wiesbaden, holding off 70.3 World Champion Michael Raelert. In 2010, he placed second behind Rasmus Henning at the 2010 Challenge Roth triathlon.

In 2012, Kienle was able to use his strong bike talent to propel himself to a victory in 2012 at the Ironman 70.3 World Championships. He placed 4th a month later at the 2012 Ironman World Championships, posting the second fastest bike split of the day - despite incurring a flat tire. The following year, in 2013, he posted somewhat lackluster results during the season; however, Kienle defended his Ironman 70.3 title by winning the 2013 World Championship race. He turned out the second fastest bike split of the day to help him win by two minutes over Terenzo Bozzone.

Notable results
Some of Kienle's notable achievements include:

References

External links

ITU Results
 published 7 Oct 2019 Deutsche Welle (DW Documentary)

1984 births
Living people
People from Enzkreis
Sportspeople from Karlsruhe (region)
German male triathletes
Ironman world champions